Norma Cecilia Pérez Díaz (born 8 September 1966) is a Chilean social worker who served as minister.

References

1966 births

Living people
21st-century Chilean politicians
University of Concepción alumni
University of Bordeaux alumni